Deric Washburn is an American screenwriter.

Washburn graduated from Harvard College in 1959. He began his career as a playwright, penning the off-Broadway plays Ginger Anne and The Love Nest. 

He is best known for having written the original screenplay of The Deer Hunter after having co-written the story with Michael Cimino. The film won the Academy Award for Best Picture in 1978.

Washburn and Cimino spent three days writing the story, and then Washburn spent a month writing the script. Cimino then tried to deny him screenwriting credit. Washburn went to arbitration and was given full credit.

Filmography
 Silent Running (1972)
 The Deer Hunter (1978)
 The Border (1982)
 Extreme Prejudice (1987)

Unproduced scripts

Heavy Dust, adapted from Manhunt by Peter Maas.
Gun for Sale, adapted from the book of the same name by Graham Greene.

Awards

As a member of the Actors Studio playwriting project, he received a $1500.00 award from the  Edward Albee Foundation in 1964.

As a writer, Washburn was nominated for an Academy Award for Best Writing (Original Screenplay) and a WGA Award for "Best Drama Written Directly for the Screen" for The Deer Hunter, along with Quinn Redeker, Louis A. Garfinkle and Michael Cimino.

References

External links
 

American male screenwriters
Living people
Place of birth missing (living people)
Harvard College alumni
1937 births